Konstantinos Mazarakis-Ainian (1869–1949) was a Hellenic Army officer who rose to the rank of Lieutenant General.

Life 
Konstantinos Mazarakis-Ainian was born in the island of Kythnos in 1869. He entered the Hellenic Military Academy and was commissioned a 2nd Lieutenant of Artillery in 1890. He fought in the Greco-Turkish War of 1897, and led a guerrilla band during the Macedonian Struggle under the nom de guerre of Kapetan Akritas (Καπετάν Ακρίτας). In the Balkan Wars, he led volunteer scout detachments; his units operated in advance and in the flanks of the main army, and played a crucial role in the capture of vital bridges and railways.

By 1916, he was placed in Thessaloniki as the commander of a mountain artillery regiment. He played a major role in the September 1916 coup d'état by the Venizelist "Movement of National Defence", and served as head of the Artillery Directorate in the subsequent National Defence government. In 1918, he was posted to Bern as Greek military attaché to Switzerland. He returned to Greece in 1919 to assume command of the Xanthi Division during the occupation of Western Thrace. In 1920, he led his division to a landing on Bandirma during the Greek offensive against the Kemalists, and shortly after in the occupation of Eastern Thrace, against the local Turkish forces of Cafer Tayyar.

Following the Greek defeat in Anatolia by the Kemalists in August 1922, he chaired the commission of inquiry into the reasons for the defeat. He was promoted to Lieutenant General, and retired from service on 11 October 1926.

He died in 1949.

Gallery

Sources 

 

1869 births
1949 deaths
Hellenic Army lieutenant generals
Eastern Orthodox Christians from Greece
Greek military personnel of the Balkan Wars
Greek military personnel of World War I
Greek military personnel of the Greco-Turkish War (1919–1922)
Greek military personnel of the Macedonian Struggle
People from Kythnos